Helen Beauclerk (20 September 1892 – 8 July 1969) was a British writer and translator.

Biography
Helen De Vere Beauclerk or Helen Beauclerk as she was also known are pseudonyms of Helen Mary Dorothea Bellingham. She was born in Cambridge in 1892 to Major Sydney Edwin Bellingham and Helen Mary Dunlop. Her father was in the British army and was based in India where he died just a year after she was born. The baby was adopted by a family friend, Major Ferdinand de Vere Beauclerk. Beauclerk was educated in the Conservatoire de Paris and worked as a music teacher and piano accompanist until the start of the First World War when she returned to the United Kingdom. She worked for the London Evening Standard and the Birmingham Post. While in Britain she met the artist Edmund Dulac and they lived together from 1924 until his death. She modelled for him and he illustrated two of her novels, The Green Lacquer Pavilion and The Love of the Foolish Angel. Beauclerk wrote fantasy novels which leaned heavily on the tradition of French fantastic fiction. As well as writing novels, Beauclerk translated the works of Colette, Dominique Lapierre and others into English. In addition to being a model for some of Dulac's work, she was also painted by George W Lambert in 1914.

Bibliography
The Tale of Igor (1918)
The Green Lacquer Pavilion (1926)
The Love of the Foolish Angel (1929)
The Mountain and the Tree (1935)
Shadows On the Wall (1941)
Where the Treasure Is (1944)
There Were Three Men (1949)
Non fiction
Earthly Paradise (1974)

References

1892 births
1969 deaths
20th-century British women writers
British fantasy writers
People from Cambridge
Pseudonymous women writers
20th-century British translators
20th-century pseudonymous writers